WDIN (102.9 FM), branded on-air as Dimension 103, is a radio station broadcasting a Spanish variety format. It is licensed to Camuy, Puerto Rico, and it serves the Puerto Rico area.

The station is owned by Isabel Ruiz Rodriguez, through licensee Northcoast Broadcasters, Inc.

The station is relayed through booster stations, WDIN-FM2 in Mayaguez and WDIN-FM3 in Yauco, both operating at 102.9 FM.

History
The station went on the air as WCHQ-FM on October 2, 1968.  It is remembered for its "HQ-103" moniker. On October 10, 1997, the station changed its call sign to the current WDIN.

References

External links

DINa
Radio stations established in 1968
Camuy, Puerto Rico
1968 establishments in Puerto Rico